Red Deer/Truant Aerodrome  is located  west northwest of Red Deer, Alberta.

See also
 List of airports in the Red Deer area

References

Registered aerodromes in Alberta
Red Deer County
Transport in Red Deer, Alberta